In computer science, the Apostolico–Giancarlo algorithm is a variant of the Boyer–Moore string-search algorithm, the basic application of which is searching for occurrences of a pattern  in a text . Application of the Boyer-Moore shift rules often results in large chunks of the text being skipped entirely.

With regard to the shift operation, Apostolico–Giancarlo is exactly equivalent in functionality to Boyer–Moore. The utility of Apostolico–Giancarlo is to speed up the match-checking operation at any index. It can be seen as a generalization of the Galil rule.

References
 
 
 
 
 
 

String matching algorithms